Hebius petersii, Peters's keelback, is a species of snake of the family Colubridae. The snake is found in Indonesia and Malaysia.

References 

petersii
Reptiles of Indonesia
Reptiles of Malaysia
Reptiles described in 1893
Taxa named by George Albert Boulenger
Reptiles of Borneo